Mikania millei, the poroto angu, is a species of flowering plant in the family Asteraceae. It is endemic to Ecuador. Its natural habitat is subtropical or tropical high-altitude grassland. It is threatened by habitat loss.

References

millei
Endemic flora of Ecuador
Endangered plants
Taxonomy articles created by Polbot